Maritime Bus is a Canadian coach operator based in Charlottetown, Prince Edward Island. The company began operations on December 1, 2012, after Acadian Lines discontinued service on November 30.

History
Maritime Bus began operations in December 2012, serving 15,500 passengers in its first month. This increased to 16,700 in the month of March and averaged about 15,000 per month for its first year of operation. Its busiest single day of operation was on October 13, 2014 (Thanksgiving Monday) when ridership totalled 1,757 passengers. The bus service also provides daily same-day parcel delivery to all its terminals in the Maritimes and Quebec. Maritime Bus is a subsidiary of its parent company, Coach Atlantic Group.

Legal status
The application for incorporation was filed on August 16, 2012, and was originally going to be called Atlantic Express Inc. During the incorporation process, the name of the applicant was
changed to Tri-Maritime Bus Network Inc.

See also
Acadian Lines

References

External links
 

Companies based in Charlottetown
Intercity bus companies of Canada
Bus transport in New Brunswick
Bus transport in Nova Scotia
Bus transport in Prince Edward Island
Canadian companies established in 2012
2012 establishments in Prince Edward Island
Transport in Campbellton, New Brunswick